Saiful Muluk National Park is situated in the Kaghan Valley within the Mansehra District of Khyber Pakhtunkhwa, Pakistan. The park was officially declared in 2003, and is centred upon the alpine Saiful Muluk Lake.

Flora and fauna
The flora  includes the trees, shrubs, perennials, and herbs of the Himalayan Western Himalayan subalpine conifer forests and higher elevation Western Himalayan alpine shrub and meadows ecoregions.

Some of the park's fauna includes the snow leopard, Asiatic black bear, marmot, weasel, eurasian lynx, Indian leopard, Himalayan snowcock, and the snow partridge. The park's lakes and wetlands habitats are of significant ecological importance for resident fauna and migratory waterfowl.

Region
Lulusar-Dudipatsar National Park, with Lulusar Lake and Dudipatsar Lake, is adjacent to Saiful Muluk National Park in the Kaghan Valley region. Together the parks protect .

See also

List of lakes in Pakistan
List of parks and gardens in Pakistan

References

Index: Flora of Himalayan Region
National parks of Pakistan
Mansehra District
Parks in Khyber Pakhtunkhwa